Andromeda nebula may refer to:

 Andromeda Galaxy, a spiral galaxy in the Andromeda constellation
 Andromeda (novel), a 1957 science fiction novel by Ivan Efremov
 The Andromeda Nebula, a 1967 Soviet film based on the above novel